The Voice Belgique is a francophone Belgian reality television singing competition. The TV show is part of the international "Voice" franchise that started in the Netherlands as The Voice of Holland. It kicked off on December 20, 2011, one month after its Flemish Belgian counterpart, The Voice van Vlaanderen went on air. It is currently airing on La Une from RTBF network.

One of the important premises of the show is the quality of the singing talent. Four coaches, themselves popular performing artists, train the talents in their group and occasionally perform with them. Talents are selected in blind auditions, where the coaches cannot see, but only hear the auditioner.

Format 

The series consists of three phases: a blind audition, a battle phase, and live performance shows. Four judges/coaches, all noteworthy recording artists, choose teams of contestants through a blind audition process. Each judge has the length of the auditioner's performance (about one minute) to decide if he or she wants that singer on his or her team; if two or more judges want the same singer (as happens frequently), the singer has the final choice of coach.

Each team of singers is mentored and developed by its respective coach. In the second stage, called the battle phase, coaches have two of their team members battle against each other directly by singing the same song together, with the coach choosing which team member to advance from each of four individual "battles" into the first live round. Within that first live round, the surviving four acts from each team again compete head-to-head, with public votes determining one of two acts from each team that will advance to the final eight. At the same time, the coach chooses which of the remaining three acts comprises the other performer remaining on the team.

In the final phase, the remaining contestants (Final 24) compete against each other in live broadcasts. The television audience and the coaches have an equal say (50/50) in deciding who moves on to the final 4. With one team member remaining for each coach, the (final 4) contestants compete against each other in the finale with the outcome decided solely by public vote.

Coaches and finalists

Coaches' timeline

Key
 Featured as a full-time coach
 Featured as a guest coach

Coaches' teams 
  Winning
  Runner-up
  Third place
  Fourth place

Series overview

The Voice Kids Belgique 
In July 2019, RTBF announced that they would produce their own version of The Voice Kids. Like the Flemish version, the Wallonian version requires participants to be between the ages of 8 and 14. The first season premiered on January 7, 2020. Océana Siciliano, coached by Slimane, won the first season. As of April 12, 2022 casting for the second season is now open and is expected to premiere in 2023.

Coaches and finalists

Coaches' timeline

Series overview

External links
The Voice Belgique Official website

See also
The Voice (franchise)

References

Belgium
French-language television programming in Belgium
French-language television shows
2011 Belgian television series debuts
2010s Belgian television series
Belgian reality television series
La Une original programming